3rd New York Film Critics Online Awards
December 15, 2003
The 3rd New York Film Critics Online Awards, honoring the best in filmmaking in 2003, were given on 15 December 2003.

Top 10 Films

 1. Lost in Translation 
 2. American Splendor 
 3. In America 
 4. 21 Grams 
 5. A Mighty Wind 
 5. Cold Mountain 
 5. Girl with a Pearl Earring 
 5. Lawless Heart 
 5. Les invasions barbares (The Barbarian Invasions) 
 10. The Station Agent

Winners
 Best Actor: Bill Murray – Lost in Translation
 Best Actress: Charlize Theron – Monster
 Best Animated Film: Finding Nemo
 Best Cinematography: Girl with a Pearl Earring – Eduardo Serra
 Best Director: Sofia Coppola – Lost in Translation 
 Best Documentary: Winged Migration
 Best Film: Lost in Translation
 Best Foreign Language Film: Demonlover • France
 Best Screenplay: In America – Jim Sheridan, Naomi Sheridan, and Kirsten Sheridan
 Best Supporting Actor: Alec Baldwin – The Cooler
 Best Supporting Actress: Scarlett Johansson – Lost in Translation
 Breakthrough Performer: Peter Dinklage – The Station Agent

References

New York Film Critics Online Awards
2003 film awards
2003 in American cinema